The Anti-Permanent Pearlman Poster League of the East (APPPLE) was an early (1979-1984) example of grass-roots political satire performed to generate media coverage. It employed tactics now known as culture jamming and guerilla communication that have been widely popularized by Billionaires for Bush, Greene Dragon, Code Pink, and other organizations.

Named after Al Pearlman—a Philadelphia Democratic City Councilman at Large elected in 1975, 1979, and 1983 and unsuccessful candidate for a Democratic State Senator nomination in 1982—its purpose was to protest Pearlman's practice of campaigning through masonite signs, 2x4 feet, nailed to telephone poles fifteen feet off the ground and not removed after elections as required by law.  Some stayed up for several elections and were simply modified with new lever pull instructions from one election to the next.

The sign issue was symbolic of the "in your face" attitude of both Pearlman and his political friend, ally, and mentor, Philadelphia Mayor Frank L. Rizzo.  The posters were generally constructed and installed by members of the Philadelphia Building Trades, strong political allies of both Pearlman and Rizzo.

The Pearlman posters featured pictures of Pearlman, which the Anti-Pearlman Permanent Poster League would decorate with creative new designs in the broad daylight wearing white coveralls with a large apple on the back. They would often call Philadelphia Inquirer columnist Clark DeLeon prior to the redesign jobs who would month after month reveal their latest exploits to his readers with stories and pictures.  Most of the posters were removed by Pearlman's people within days of the changes.

Humor was a large part of APPPLE's MO.  Their leader, McIntosh, noted that they started with "fewer than one thousand members and soon grew to fewer than two thousand members".

APPLERs used pseudonyms such as Winesap, Turnover, Streudel, Crab etc. and remained anonymous, letting their artwork and commentary speak for itself.
The group ceased its activities after Pearlman, fatally stricken with cancer, committed suicide at the age of 54 on June 10, 1984, in his hospital room with a gun brought by a former wife.

Known Posters/Design Influences

Media Reference Chronology

APPPLE Core Media References

Additional APPPLE Media References

References

Culture jamming
Posters